Eva Haslinghuis (born 21 July 1972) is a Dutch former professional tennis player.

Haslinghuis started on tour in the late 1990s and On 1 March 1993, she reached her highest WTA singles rankings of 284 and best doubles rankings of 215.

Her only WTA Tour main-draw appearance came at the 1992 Belgian Open where she partnered Esmir Hoogendoorn in the doubles event. They lost in the First Round to Dutch Manon Bollegraf and Dutch Caroline Vis.

ITF finals

Singles: 3 (1–2)

Doubles: 5 (4–1)

References

External links
 
 

1972 births
Living people
Dutch female tennis players
20th-century Dutch women
21st-century Dutch women